Milunka Savić CMG (28 June 1892 or 10 August 1888 – 5 October 1973) was a Serbian war heroine who fought in the Balkan Wars and in World War I. She is the most-decorated female combatant in the recorded history of warfare.

Military career

Savić was born in 1888, in the village of Koprivnica, near Novi Pazar, in Serbia. In 1912, her brother who was ill with tuberculosis received call-up papers for mobilization for the First Balkan War. She chose to go in his place—cutting her hair and donning men's clothes and joining the Serbian army. She quickly saw combat and received her first medal and was promoted to corporal in the Battle of Bregalnica. Engaged in battle, she sustained wounds and it was only then, when recovering from her injuries in hospital, that her true gender was revealed, much to the surprise of the attending physicians.

Mental Floss described the repercussions:

"Savic was called before her commanding officer. They didn't want to punish her, because she had proven a valuable and highly competent soldier. The military deployment that had resulted in her sex being revealed had been her tenth. But neither was it suitable for a young woman to be in combat. She was offered a transfer to the Nursing division. Savic stood at attention and insisted she only wanted to fight for her country as a combatant. The officer said he'd think it over and give her his answer the next day. Still standing at attention, Savic responded, "I will wait." It is said he only made her stand an hour before agreeing to send her back to the infantry."

In 1914, in the early days of World War I, Savić was awarded her first Karađorđe Star with Swords after the Battle of Kolubara. She received her second Karađorđe Star (with Swords) after the Battle of the Crna Bend in 1916 when she captured 23 Bulgarian soldiers single-handedly.

Military honors
She was awarded the French Légion d’Honneur (Legion of Honour) twice, as well as the Russian Cross of St. George, the British medal of the Most Distinguished Order of St Michael, and the Serbian Miloš Obilić medal. She was the sole female recipient of the French Croix de Guerre 1914–1918 with the gold palm attribute for service in World War I.

Later life

She was demobilised in 1919, and turned down an offer to move to France, where she was eligible to collect a comfortable French army pension. Instead, she chose to live in Belgrade and found work as a postal worker. In 1923, she married Veljko Gligorijević, whom she met in Mostar, and divorced immediately after the birth of their daughter Milena.  She also adopted three other daughters. In the interwar period, Milunka was largely forgotten by the general public. She worked several menial jobs up to 1927, after which she had steady employment as a cleaning lady in the State Mortgage Bank. Eight years later, she was promoted to cleaning the offices of the general manager.

During the German occupation of Serbia in World War II, Milunka refused to attend a banquet organized by Milan Nedić, which was to be attended by German generals and officers. She was arrested and taken to Banjica concentration camp, where she was imprisoned for ten months.

In 1945, with the arrival of socialism to power, she was given a state pension, and continued to live in her house in Belgrade's Voždovac neighborhood. By the late 1950s her daughter was hospitalized, and she was living in a crumbling house in Voždovac with her three adopted children: Milka, a forgotten child from the railway station in Stalac; Radmila-Višnja; and Zorka, a fatherless girl from Dalmatia. Later, when she attended the jubilee celebrations wearing her military medals, other military officers spoke with her and heard of her courageous actions. News spread and at last she gained recognition. In 1972, public pressure and a newspaper article highlighting her difficult housing and financial situation led to her being given a small apartment by the Belgrade City Assembly.

She died in Belgrade on October 5 1973, aged 85, and was buried in Belgrade New Cemetery.

Legacy 
A memorial complex with a permanent exhibition devoted to Milunka Savić was opened in October 2020 in Jošanička Banja.

In 2022, Swedish power metal band Sabaton covered her story in their song "Lady of the Dark".

See also
Flora Sandes
Sofija Jovanović
Ecaterina Teodoroiu
Maria Bochkareva
Antonija Javornik
Leslie Joy Whitehead
Olive Kelso King
Women in the military

References

Sources

External links 

The hero who was a heroine in wien.international.at

1888 births
1973 deaths
20th-century Serbian people
Banjica concentration camp inmates
Female wartime cross-dressers
Serbian military personnel of World War I
Serbian soldiers
Serbian women
Recipients of the Croix de Guerre 1914–1918 (France)
Recipients of the Legion of Honour
Recipients of the Cross of St. George
Honorary Companions of the Order of St Michael and St George
People from Novi Pazar
Serbian women in World War I
Women soldiers
Banjica concentration camp survivors
Royal Serbian Army soldiers
Female recipients of the Croix de Guerre (France)